Roger Charles Carmel (September 27, 1932 – November 11, 1986) was an American actor. He originated several roles on Broadway, played scores of guest roles in television series, was a lead in the sitcom The Mothers-in-Law and appeared in motion pictures. He is most famous for his recurring role as the conniving con artist, Harry Mudd, in Star Trek.

Career
Carmel worked on Broadway from the late 1950s into the mid-1960s. He played multiple parts in The Power and the Glory (1958). He originated the roles of the 3rd Poet in Caligula (1960), Pasha in Once There Was a Russian (1961), The Deputy in Purlie Victorious (1961), and Mr. Andrikos in The Irregular Verb to Love (1963). He replaced Jack Creley in the role of Cardinal Wolsey in A Man for All Seasons (in 1962) and also replaced James Grout in Half a Sixpence (in 1966).

On television Carmel starred as the henpecked husband Roger Buell in the 1967 first season of the NBC sitcom The Mothers-in-Law, but was replaced by Richard Deacon in season two. When the first season ended, creator and producer, Desi Arnaz told the entire cast that the show had a five-year guarantee but there was no money to give the contractual raises for the second season. While the other cast members agreed to forgo their salary increases, Carmel refused to forgo his. Carmel believed that Arnaz was illegally taking four salaries from the series—producer, creator, writer and director—and this led him to quit the show (incidentally, the series was cancelled the following year).

Carmel's television guest roles included the accountant Doug Wesley on CBS's The Dick Van Dyke Show and Colonel Gumm on ABC's Batman. He played the flamboyant and hapless galactic criminal Harcourt Fenton "Harry" Mudd in two episodes of the original series of Star Trek, "Mudd's Women" (1966) and "I, Mudd" (1967), and one episode of Star Trek: The Animated Series, "Mudd's Passion" (1973). He also appeared in roles on The Patty Duke Show; I Spy; Blue Light; The Everglades; Hogan's Heroes; Car 54, Where Are You?; Banacek; The Man from U.N.C.L.E.; The Munsters; Voyage to the Bottom of the Sea; Hawaii Five-O; The High Chaparral; All in the Family, and The San Pedro Beach Bums. He was a regular contestant on Pantomime Quiz, also known as Stump the Stars. His film roles included Gambit, Myra Breckinridge, Breezy, Thunder and Lightning, and Jerry Lewis's comeback film, Hardly Working (1981).

Later life and death
Later in his career, Carmel was a frequent voice actor. He voiced Smokey Bear in fire safety advertisements and Decepticon deputy leader Cyclonus in the third season of the Transformers animated series (having originated the role in 1986's Transformers: The Movie and voicing other characters in the series' second season). In the television commercials for the Naugles chain of Mexican fast-food restaurants, he played the character of Señor Naugles.

According to a letter column in the first volume of the monthly DC Comics Star Trek comic book, Carmel was slated to reprise his role as Harry Mudd in a first-season episode of Star Trek: The Next Generation, but died before filming could commence.

Carmel was found dead in his Hollywood apartment on November 11, 1986. His death certificate listed hypertrophic cardiomyopathy as the cause. Prior to his autopsy, police had speculated a "narcotics overdose." He was interred in New Mount Carmel Cemetery in Glendale, Queens, New York City. His plot is in the section dedicated to his parents' synagogue, Temple Beth Emeth.

Television

Filmography

References

External links

Video
 Roger C. Carmel in a Marathon candy bar commercial – Public Domain YouTube ad

1932 births
1986 deaths
American male television actors
American male voice actors
Brown University alumni
People from Brooklyn
Jewish American male actors
Male actors from New York City
Male actors from Los Angeles
20th-century American male actors
20th-century American Jews